Telkabad (also Romanized as Telkābād and Tolkābād) is a village in Rigestan Rural District, Zavareh District, Ardestan County, Isfahan Province, Iran. At the 2006 census, its population was 1,422 in 361 families.

References 

Populated places in Ardestan County